Mahmudabad-e Yek Dang (also Romanized as Maḩmūdābād-e Yek Dāng; also known as Maḩmūdābād-e Yek Dāngeh, Maḩmūdābād Yek Dāngeh, and Yek Dāngeh) is a village in Tasuj Rural District, in the Central District of Kavar County, Fars Province, Iran. At the 2006 census, its population was 507, in 126 families.

References 

Populated places in Kavar County